Roslan Buang (born 1939 in Selangor) is a former Selangor FA and Malaya player. He was often called the "Trojan" by fans because of his hard playing style to make quick runs from the side and make cross passes.

Career overview
A left-back, Roslan was a squad player for Selangor FA that captured the 1959, 1961, 1962 and 1963 Malaysia Cup editions. He also won 1960, 1961 and 1962 Malaysia FAM Cup.

In 1959, he was selected for the inaugural Asian Youth Championship.

He also a part of the Malaya player that winning 1960 Merdeka Cup and bronze medals in the 1962 Asian Games.

Honours

Selangor
Malaysia Cup: 1959, 1961, 1962, 1963 
Malaysia FAM Cup: 1960, 1961, 1962

Malaya U19
AFC Youth Championship: runner-up 1959,  1960

Malaya
Asian Games: Bronze Medal 1962
Merdeka Cup: 1960

References

Malaysian footballers
1938 births
People from Selangor
Association football defenders
Selangor FA players